Greenmeadows Park is a park and suburb of Stoke, New Zealand. It lies close to the centre of Stoke, southwest of Nelson city centre.

References

Suburbs of Nelson, New Zealand
Populated places in the Nelson Region